The Russia national under-19 speedway team is the national under-19 speedway team of Russia and is controlled by the Motorcycle Federation of Russia.  The team has never qualify to the Team Speedway Junior European Championship final. In the Individual competition was won one bronze medal: Artem Vodyakov (2008).

Due to the 2022 Russian invasion of Ukraine, on March 6, 2022, the Fédération Internationale de Motocyclisme banned all Russian and Belarusian motorcycle riders, teams, officials, and competitions.

Competition

See also 
 Russia national speedway team
 Russia national under-21 speedway team

References

External links 
 (ru) Motorcycle Federation of Russia webside

National speedway teams
Speedway